Bhimavaram Bullodu is a 2014 Telugu romance film written by Kavi Kalidas and directed by Udayasankar. Produced by Daggubati Suresh Babu on his home banner Suresh Productions, the film features Sunil, Ester Noronha And Vikramjeet Virk in the lead roles. Anoop Rubens composed music for this film while Santosh Rai Pathaje and Marthand K. Venkatesh handled the cinematography and editing departments respectively.

The story follows a young brain tumor patient who wants to wipe off the rowdyism around himself and the troubles he faces once he starts the work and discovers that he is not a cancer patient. The film released worldwide on 21 February 2014. Upon release, the film received mostly negative reviews from critics, but had good box office collections.

Cast

 Sunil as Rambabu
 Ester Noronha as Nandini
 Vikramjeet Virk as Vikram
 Sayaji Shinde as Nandini's father
 Subbaraju as Kondapalli Suri
 Posani Krishna Murali as Police Officer Posani, Rambabu's brother
 Satyam Rajesh as Rambabu's friend
 Telangana Shakuntala as Rambabu's grandmother
 Tanikella Bharani as a person who convinces Rambabu to not to commit suicide
 Pruthviraj as a blind man
 Jaya Prakash Reddy as Reddy
 Ahuti Prasad as Doctor
 Raghu Babu as Kashi
 Srinivasa Reddy as Yadagiri
 Gautam Raju as villager
 Supreeth
 Raghu Karumanchi
 Thagubothu Ramesh 
 Gundu Sudarshan as Sarath Babu, railway passenger

Soundtrack
The music was composed by Anup Rubens and released by Aditya Music.

References

External links
 

2010s Telugu-language films
2014 films
Films shot in Vijayawada
Films set in Hyderabad, India
Films shot in Hyderabad, India
Suresh Productions films
Films set in Vijayawada
Films directed by Udayasankar